Phrynobatrachus werneri is a species of frog in the family Phrynobatrachidae. It is only known with certainty from western Cameroon, although there is a putative record from Chappal Waddi in Nigeria, close to the border of Cameroon; the earlier record from the Obudu Plateau in Nigeria is now assigned to Phrynobatrachus schioetzi described as a new species in 2011. The status of Phrynobatrachus manengoubensis from Mount Manengouba remains unclear, with some questioning its distinctness from Phrynobatrachus werneri. Common name Werner's river frog has been coined for this species.

Etymology
The specific name werneri honours Franz Werner, an Austrian explorer, zoologist, and herpetologist.

Description
The tympanum is distinct. The tips of the digits are widened or expanded into small discs. The toes have no or only rudimentary webbing. The tympanic region is dark and shows a supratypanic ridge. Females are pale ventrally. Males have a black throat and some darker pigmentation on the chest and anterior of the belly.

Habitat and conservation
Phrynobatrachus werneri is found in and around small bodies of water such as streams, roadside ditches, Raphia swamps and marshes in submontane and montane forest and grassland landscapes. It tolerates habitat alteration. Breeding takes place in still water, including marshes.

It is a common and adaptable species that is not at serious risk from habitat change. It might occur in the Bafut-Ngemba Forest Reserve.

References

werneri
Frogs of Africa
Amphibians of Cameroon
Endemic fauna of Cameroon
Taxa named by Fritz Nieden
Amphibians described in 1910
Taxonomy articles created by Polbot
Fauna of the Cameroonian Highlands forests